Aria was a Japanese monthly josei/shōjo manga magazine published by Kodansha. In April 2010 an announcement was made about plans for a new magazine; its first issue was published on July 28, 2010. The magazine was released in size B5 paper. The magazine targeted a more mature audience of women between the ages of 16 and 22.

In 2013, Kodansha temporarily increased Arias print count by roughly 500% to approximately 80,000 copies because of the demand for the prologue chapter of the Attack on Titan spin-off Attack on Titan: No Regrets, which was published before the serialization began. It was announced on March 27 that the Magazine would cease its publication on April 28, 2018,  as most of the series would be moved to Kodansha's new app Palcy.

Serializations
Haikyo Shoujo (2010–2012)
Demon From Afar (2010–2013)
Manga Dogs (2010–2013)
He's My Only Vampire (2010–2014)
No. 6 (2011–2016)
Ani-Imo (2012–2014)
First Love Monster (2013–2016)
Attack on Titan: No Regrets (2013–2014)
Alice in Murderland (2014–2018)
The Seven Deadly Sins Production (2015–2017)

References

External links
Official website 

2010 establishments in Japan
2018 disestablishments in Japan
Defunct magazines published in Japan
Josei manga magazines
Kodansha magazines
Magazines established in 2010
Magazines disestablished in 2018
Magazines published in Tokyo
Monthly manga magazines published in Japan
Shōjo manga magazines